Happy New Ear is the second live album by Serbian rock band Van Gogh released in 2001. The album was recorded on the band's concert held December 24, 1999, in Sports Hall in Belgrade, which was a part of the Happy New Ear Tour.

Track listing
"New Ear Kid" - 0:33
"Bez oblika" - 4:19
"Puls" - 4:37
"Extaza" - 3:54
"Manitu" - 4:41
"Demagogija - 3:57
"Zamisli" - 6:09
"Teška ljubav" - 4:20
"Pleme" - 3:38
"Basna" - 4:17
"Brod od papira" - 4:43
"Opasan ples" - 5:40
"Teška ljubav" (Video)

Personnel
Zvonimir Đukić - guitar, vocals
Dušan Bogunović - bass guitar
Srboljub Radivojević - drums

References 
 EX YU ROCK enciklopedija 1960-2006,  Janjatović Petar;

External links
Happy New Ear at Discogs

2001 live albums
Van Gogh (band) live albums
Metropolis Records (Serbia) live albums